A family association or family organization is an organization formed by people who share a common ancestor or surname. They join for a variety of purposes, including exchanging genealogical information, sharing current news about family members, having reunions, and promoting family pride and unity among living descendants. Family organizations or associations centered on a more distant common ancestor are often referred to as "ancestral family organizations," while those centered on a commonly shared surname are commonly referred to as "single surname family organizations".

Some family associations strive to collect information about people with their surname all over the world, while others consist of a relatively small family group in a specific geographic area. Some groups put a lot of effort into family research while others prefer to concentrate more on family reunions and current family news.

Family associations and organizations often figure prominently among the Overseas Chinese. Family association buildings are often prominent features of Chinatowns. They also figure prominently among descendants of Mormon pioneers and other early converts to the Church of Jesus Christ of Latter-day Saints.

See also
 Chinese clan associations
 Guild of One-Name Studies
 List of hereditary and lineage organizations
 List of Mormon family organizations

References

Genealogical societies
Family history